John Barclay Moon (July 20, 1849 – February 20, 1915) was an American lawyer and politician who served in the Virginia House of Delegates.

References

External links 

1849 births
1915 deaths
Democratic Party members of the Virginia House of Delegates
19th-century American politicians